"Weiß Flügel" [sic: weiße Flügel] is Yousei Teikoku's 8th single.  It was released on September 10, 2008.  The title means "white wings" in German.

Track listing 
 "Weiß Flügel" - 4:25
 機械少女幻想 (Kikai Shoujo Gensou; "Machine Girl's Fantasy") - 3:22
 "Weiß Flügel" (Instrumental) - 4:25
 機械少女幻想 (Instrumental) - 3:19

References

2008 singles
Japanese songs
2008 songs
Lantis (company) singles
Song articles with missing songwriters